A Tribute to Duke is a 1977 studio album by various artists, recorded in homage to bandleader and composer Duke Ellington.

Reception
The Allmusic review by JT Griffith awarded the album 3 stars stating:
This short, nine-track tribute to the legendary Duke Ellington packs more swing into its 36-minute length than you'd expect. The disc features guest performances from Bing Crosby, Rosemary Clooney, Tony Bennett, and Woody Herman...The instrumental "Main Stem" is a rollicking number that sadly fades out after five minutes. Crosby's "Don't Get Around Much Anymore" features some of his more adventurous vocalizations... A Tribute to Duke plays like a wonderful appetizer, readying your palette for more music. The only weakness of this disc is that it is too short.".

Although he was to still record in the U.K., this marked the last occasion that Bing Crosby recorded in America.

Track listing

Personnel
The backing musicians for all performers are the following:
Bill Berry – trumpet
Nat Pierce – piano
Monty Budwig – double bass
Jake Hanna – drums

References

1977 albums
Duke Ellington tribute albums
Albums produced by Carl Jefferson
Concord Records albums